Joshua B. Plotkin is an evolutionary biologist and applied mathematician. He is the Walter H. and Leonore C. Annenberg Professor of Natural Sciences at the University of Pennsylvania. Plotkin's research includes the study of the evolution of adaptation in populations, virus ecology, genetic drift, protein translation, and social norms.

He serves on the editorial boards for Science Magazine and Cell Reports.

External links
 Plotkin Research Group website

References

Living people
Mathematical ecologists
21st-century American biologists
American ecologists
University of Pennsylvania faculty
Walter H. Annenberg Professor
Mathematicians at the University of Pennsylvania
University of Pennsylvania Department of Biology faculty
Princeton University alumni
Harvard University alumni
Year of birth missing (living people)